Jaime da Silva Graça (30 January 1942 – 28 February 2012) was a Portuguese football midfielder and coach.

Club career
Born in Setúbal, Graça made his professional – and Primeira Liga – debut with local Vitória Futebol Clube, appearing in nearly 150 official games over five seasons and helping the Sadinos to three Taça de Portugal finals during his spell.

In summer 1966, after scoring a combined 28 goals in his last two seasons with Vitória, he signed with S.L. Benfica, where he would win seven national championships and three Portuguese Cups, playing 229 matches all competitions comprised (29 goals). He netted the equaliser in the 1967–68 European Cup final, a 1–4 extra time loss against Manchester United.

On 5 December 1966, Benfica's new hydro massage bath short-circuited with seven players immersed. Luciano Fernandes was electrocuted before Graça – an electrician by trade before he became a professional footballer – could save himself and the others, and the team played the rest of that season in black.

After featuring rarely during his latter years at the Estádio da Luz, the 33-year-old Graça returned to his first club, retiring from the game in 1977 with Portuguese top-flight (the only division he competed in) totals of 303 matches and 55 goals. He was in charge of C.D. Santa Clara as the Azores side were promoted to the second division in 1987, but could not prevent relegation the following year.

International career
Graça collected 36 caps for the Portugal national team and scored four goals, mostly whilst as a Benfica player. His debut came on 24 January 1965, in a 5–1 home victory over Turkey for the 1966 FIFA World Cup qualifiers.

Graça was selected for the final stages in England, appearing in all the games for the eventual third-placed team. He also represented the nation in the Brazilian Independence Cup in 1972, where Portugal lost to hosts Brazil, in what would be his last international appearance.

Graça assisted José Torres in the ill-fated 1986 World Cup in Mexico, marred by the Saltillo Affair.

Death
On 28 February 2012, Graça died at the Lusíadas Hospital in Lisbon after a long battle with illness. He was 70 years old.

Career statistics
Scores and results list Portugal's goal tally first, score column indicates score after each Graça goal.

Honours
Setúbal
Taça de Portugal: 1964–65

Benfica
Primeira Divisão:  1966–67, 1967–68, 1968–69, 1970–71, 1971–72, 1972–73, 1974–75
Taça de Portugal: 1968–69, 1969–70, 1971–72
Taça de Honra (3)
European Cup runner-up: 1967–68

Portugal
FIFA World Cup third place: 1966

References

External links

1942 births
2012 deaths
Sportspeople from Setúbal
Portuguese footballers
Association football midfielders
Primeira Liga players
Vitória F.C. players
G.D. Sesimbra footballers
S.L. Benfica footballers
Eléctrico F.C. players
Portugal international footballers
1966 FIFA World Cup players
Portuguese football managers
Liga Portugal 2 managers
C.D. Santa Clara managers